A.S.D. Martina Calcio 1947, formerly A.S. Martina Franca 1947, and A.C. Martina, usually referred to as simply Martina Franca  or just Martina, is an Italian association football club, based in Martina Franca, Apulia. The club was re-founded in 2008 as A.S.D. Martina Franca 1947 and again 2016 as A.S.D. Martina Calcio 1947.

History 
The club was founded in 1947.

Martina has played in Serie C1 Group B in the 2007–08 season, finishing last, and thus directly relegated to Lega Pro Seconda Divisione (ex-Serie C2).

The club needed new financial backers, but with its relegation to Italy's fourth level of professional football, no investors were found and the club decided to withdraw from the 2008–09 season. All players were released.

2008 re-foundation 

At the same time with the dissolve of A.C. Martina, a phoenix club, A.S.D. Martina Franca was founded in the same transfer window. It was admitted in the Prima Categoria Apulia. The club finished as the second in 2008–09 Prima Categoria Apulia season and promoted to Promozione Apulia.

The  has won the Promozione Apulia playoffs and the promotion to  season. The company Ostuni Sports, militant in Serie D, Martina proposes an exchange of sports titles that would allow a double promotion, but after a first initial interest in the company it was decided to give up and then participate in Eccellenza Apulia.

In the 2010–11 season, after a long battle with Cerignola which ended only in extra time of the promotion playoff, Martina was finally promoted to 2011–12 Serie D.

In the 2011–12 Serie D season, Martina Franca was promoted to Lega Pro Seconda Divisione. This marked the return of Martina in professionally football with 4 promotions in 4 years.

Martina was relegated back to Serie D after ending the 2013–14 Lega Pro Seconda Divisione in thirteenth place, only to be admitted back to the 2014–15 Lega Pro after being picked in order to fill a league vacancy.

In 2016, the club did not enrolled in the professional league, thus all players were released.

2016 re-foundation
A phoenix club, A.S.D. Martina Calcio 1947, was admitted to Prima Categoria Apulia on 8 September 2016.

Colors and badge 
The team's colors are blue and white.

References

External links 
 Official website of A.S. Martina Franca 1947 

Football clubs in Apulia
AS Martina
Association football clubs established in 1947
Serie C clubs
1947 establishments in Italy